Amauroderma albostipitatum is a polypore fungus in the family Ganodermataceae. It was described as a new species in 2015 by mycologists Allyne Christina Gomes-Silva, Leif Ryvarden, and Tatiana Gibertoni. The specific epithet albostipitatum refers to the characteristic whitish stipe. A. albostipitatum is found in the states of Rondônia and Roraima, in the Brazilian Amazon. It fruits on soil.

References

albostipitatum
Fungi described in 2015
Fungi of Brazil
Taxa named by Leif Ryvarden